Wilfred Charles Coutts (10 June 1908 – 4 November 1997) was an Australian politician. Born in Marburg, Queensland, he was educated at state schools before becoming a salesman. He was active in local politics as a member of Brisbane City Council. In 1954, he was elected to the Australian House of Representatives as the Labor member for Griffith. He held the seat until his defeat by Liberal candidate Arthur Chresby in 1958. He returned to the House in 1961, defeating Chresby. He held the seat until his defeat in 1966 by Don Cameron. Coutts died in 1997 and was buried in Nudgee Cemetery.

References

Australian Labor Party members of the Parliament of Australia
Members of the Australian House of Representatives for Griffith
Members of the Australian House of Representatives
1908 births
1997 deaths
Burials at Nudgee Cemetery
20th-century Australian politicians